Stockyard Hill Wind Farm is a wind farm project in Victoria (Australia). In May 2022 the project achieved its 5th hold point test, and was approved by the Australian Energy Market Operator and Network Services Provider to generate up to 400MW into the National Electricity Market. When it is fully commissioned, it is expected to produce up to 530MW, which would be Australia's largest wind farm.

The development was initiated by Windpower Australia and bought by Origin Energy.

The facility consists of 149 approved wind turbines at a site approximately 35km west of Ballarat between Beaufort and Skipton. The forecast cost is A$900 million (US$750 million)  In December 2009, the original plan for 242 turbines, the plan was changed to only have 157 turbines. The Victorian minister of planning approved the 157 turbines, in October 2010.

In 2013 Origin contemplated selling the project before production would have begun, but decided to continue the project.

Construction commenced in May 2018 on a design that has 149 wind turbines. The final turbine installation occurred in December 2020 and operations began in July 2021. The Goldwind 3S turbines have a capacity of 3.57 MW, with a hub height of 110 metres, tip height of 180 metres, and rotor diameter of 140 metres. The farm is projected to generate 1900 GWh of energy annually, at a corresponding capacity factor of about 40.9%. It will power approximately 425,000 homes annually. Origin Energy has a power purchase agreement to buy all electricity until 2030.

See also

 Wind power in Australia

References

External links
 Stockyard Hill website

Wind farms in Victoria (Australia)
Proposed wind farms in Australia